Bengt Olov "Ben" Sandstrom (born 16 January 1956) is an Australian sport shooter. Since 1986, Sandstrom has competed at three Olympic Games and three Commonwealth Games.  He has competed in the air, free and standard pistol.

References

External links
 Bengt Olov "Ben" Sandstrom at the Australian Olympic Committee

Living people
1956 births
Australian male sport shooters
Olympic shooters of Australia
Shooters at the 1988 Summer Olympics
Shooters at the 1992 Summer Olympics
Shooters at the 1996 Summer Olympics
Shooters at the 1986 Commonwealth Games
Shooters at the 1990 Commonwealth Games
Shooters at the 1994 Commonwealth Games
Commonwealth Games gold medallists for Australia
Commonwealth Games silver medallists for Australia
Commonwealth Games bronze medallists for Australia
Sportsmen from Western Australia
Swedish emigrants to Australia
Commonwealth Games medallists in shooting
20th-century Australian people
Medallists at the 1986 Commonwealth Games
Medallists at the 1990 Commonwealth Games
Medallists at the 1994 Commonwealth Games